

Tertiary education

Universities:
University of Macau
Macao Polytechnic University
Macau University of Science and Technology
City University of Macau
University of Saint Joseph
United Nations University International Institute for Software Technology

Institute or other post-secondary education:
Macao Institute for Tourism Studies
 (Instituto de Enfermagem Kiang Wu de Macau, 澳門鏡湖護理學院)
 (Instituto de Gestão de Macau, 澳門管理學院)
 (Instituto Miléno de Macau, 中西創新學院)

Primary and secondary education 
Primary and secondary schools and preschools/nurseries/kindergartens are organized by their official Portuguese names. Some institutions may also have official English names.

Government schools 
Preschool through secondary:
Zheng Guanying Official School - Nossa Senhora de Fátima
Secondary only:
Macao Conservatory - Multiple locations
Escola Secundária Luso-Chinesa de Luís Gonzaga Gomes - São Lázaro
Escola Luso-Chinesa Técnico-Profissional (中葡職業技術學校) - Nossa Senhora de Fátima
Preschool, primary, and special education:
Escola Primária Oficial Luso-Chinesa "Sir Robert Ho Tung" (何東中葡小學) - São Lázaro
Preschool and Primary:
 Escola Luso-Chinesa da Taipa (氹仔中葡學校)
Escola Primária Luso-Chinesa do Bairro Norte (北區中葡小學) - Nossa Senhora de Fátima
It opened on 1 November 1990.
Primary only:
Escola Primária Luso-Chinesa da Flora (二龍喉中葡小學) - São Lázaro
Preschool only:
Jardim de Infância Luso-Chinês "Girassol" (樂富中葡幼稚園) - Nossa Senhora de Fátima
It occupies a 260 student-capacity,  area on two floors of the Edifício U Wa (裕華大廈). It opened in the Edifício “Lok Fu San Chun” on 27 March 1989 and moved to its current location in September 1997.
Special education only:
 Escola Luso-Chinesa de Coloane (路環中葡學校)

Tuition-free private schools

Tuition-free schools with upper secondary education
 Preschool through secondary school and special education
 Concordia School for Special Education (Escola Concórdia para Ensino Especial; 協同特殊教育學校) - Sé

 Preschool through secondary school
 Macau Anglican College (Colégio Anglicano de Macau) - Taipa
 Colégio Mateus Ricci - Santo António
  (聖羅撒女子中學) Chinese section - Sé
 Sacred Heart Canossian College, Macau  (Colégio do Sagrado Coração de Jesus; 嘉諾撒聖心中學) - Santo António
 Yuet Wah College  (Colégio Yuet Wah; 粵華中學) - São Lázaro
  (MBC; Escola Cham Son de Macau; 澳門浸信中學) - Nossa Senhora de Fátima
 Previously its nursery/primary campus and secondary campus were located in Sé and Nossa Senhora de Fátima, respectively
 Escola Estrela do Mar - São Lourenço
 Fong Chong School of Taipa (Escola Fong Chong da Taipa; 氹仔坊眾學校) - Taipa
 Hou Kong Middle School Macau (Escola Hou Kong; 濠江中學) - The main campus, in Nossa Senhora de Fátima, houses secondary school. There are also separate kindergarten and primary school campuses, both in Santo António, and an affiliated English-based school in Taipa.
 Kao Yip Middle School (Escola Kao Yip) - Sé
 Keang Peng School (Escola Keang Peng) - Nossa Senhora de Fátima
 Kwong Tai (Guang Da) Middle School (Escola Kwong Tai) - Main campus in Nossa Senhora de Fátima, branch campus in Santo António
 Lingnan Middle School (Escola Ling Nam; 澳門嶺南中學) - Sé
 Our Lady of Fatima Girls' School (Escola Nossa Senhora de Fátima; 化地瑪聖母女子學校) - Nossa Senhora de Fátima
  (Escola Pui Tou de Macau; 澳門培道中學) - Main campus in Sé, Taipa Elementary School Branch (澳培道中學氹仔小學分校) in Taipa.
  (Escola Secundária Pui Va; 培華中學) - Taipa
  (澳門聖保祿學校) - Nossa Senhora de Fátima
  (Escola Tong Nam; 東南學校) - Santo António - The secondary school has both junior and senior high divisions
 Escola Tong Sin Tong (同善堂中學) - Sé
  (Escola de Aplicação Anexa à Universidade de Macau; 澳門大學附屬應用學校) - Taipa - affiliated with the University of Macau
  (澳門坊眾學校) - Nossa Senhora de Fátima - Has separate junior high and senior high divisions
  (Escola para Filhos e Irmãos dos Operários; 勞工子弟學校) - Santo António - Operated by the Union for Development (Associação Geral dos Operarios de Macau)
 Instituto Salesiano da Imaculada Conceição - São Lourenço
 Sheng Kung Hui Choi Kou School Macau (Sheng Kung Hui Escola Choi Kou (Macau); 聖公會(澳門)蔡高中學) - Two campuses, with one in Nossa Senhora de Fátima for day secondary school and primary school, and one in Sé for preschool and night secondary school

 Combined primary and secondary schools
 Chan Sui Ki Perpetual Help College - São Lázaro
 Colégio de Santa Rosa de Lima English section (聖羅撒英文中學) - Sé
  (Colégio do Sagrado Coração de Jesus; 嘉諾撒聖心英文中學) English section - Santo António
  (雷鳴道主教紀念學校) - Coloane
  (Escola São João de Brito; 庇道學校) - Santo António
 Macao Sam Yuk Middle School (Escola Secundária Sam Yuk de Macau) - Taipa

 Secondary-only schools
  (澳門工聯職業技術中學) - Nossa Senhora de Fátima - Has both junior high (Ensino secundário-geral/初中教育) and senior high (Ensino secundário-complementar/高中教育) levels

Tuition-free schools without upper secondary education
 Preschool through junior high school
 Escola de São José de Ká Hó (九澳聖若瑟學校) - Coloane

 Combined preschool and primary schools
 Colégio Dom Bosco (Yuet Wah) (鮑思高粵華小學) - Nossa Senhora de Fátima
 The current school building opened in 1963, and Yuet Wah College merged into it in 2000. The school has English and Chinese sections; its Portuguese section closed in 1999.
 Escola Chong Tak de Macau (澳門中德學校) - Nossa Senhora de Fátima
 Escola Dom João Paulino - Taipa
 Escola Fukien (澳門福建學校) - Nossa Senhora de Fátima
 Escola Há Ván Châm Vui (下環浸會學校) - São Lourenço
  (海暉學校) - Nossa Senhora de Fátima
 Escola Ilha Verde da Associação Comercial de Macau (歡迎光臨青洲小學) - Nossa Senhora de Fátima
 Escola Lin Fong Pou Chai (蓮峰普濟學校) - Nossa Senhora de Fátima
 Escola Madalena de Canossa (瑪大肋納嘉諾撒學校) - Nossa Senhora de Fátima
 Escola Santa Maria Mazzarello (聖瑪沙利羅學校) - São Lourenço
 Escola Shá Lei Tau Cham Son (沙梨頭浸信學校) - Santo António
 Escola Tak Meng (德明學校) - Nossa Senhora de Fátima
 Fu Luen School (Escola da Associao Geral das Mulheres de Macau; 澳門婦聯學校) - Nossa Senhora de Fátima
 Escola da Sagrada Família (聖家學校) - Santo António
  (聖德蘭學校) - Nossa Senhora de Fátima

 Preschools
 Jardim Infantil da Cáritas (明愛幼稚園) - Nossa Senhora de Fátima - Located in Edf. Kam Hoi San Garden (金海山花園)

 Special education schools
 Escola Cáritas de Macau (明愛學校) - Taipa
 Escola Kai Chi (啟智學校) - São Lázaro

Non-free private schools
These private schools are not a part of Macau's tuition-free education network.
 Preschool through secondary school and special education
 School of the Nations - Taipa
 Preschool through secondary school
  (聖若瑟教區中學) - Sé
 Colégio Diocesano de São José 5 - Nossa Senhora de Fátima
 International School of Macao - Taipa
 Pui Ching Middle School - São Lázaro
 Primary and secondary school
 Macau Portuguese School (Escola Portuguesa de Macau) - Sé
 Secondary school
 Xin Hua Evening Secondary School (Escola Secundária Nocturna Xin Hua/新華夜中學) - Nossa Senhora de Fátima
  (商訓夜中學) - Nossa Senhora de Fátima
 Senior high school
 Millennium Secondary School (Escola Secundária Millennium/創新中學) - Sé
 Preschool and primary school
 Chan Sui Ki Perpetual Help College (Branch) (Colégio Perpétuo Socorro Chan Sui Ki(Sucursal); 母佑會陳瑞祺永援中學(分校)) - Santo António
 Preschool
 St. Anthony's Kindergarten and Nursery (Centro de Educação Infantil Santo António; 聖安東尼幼稚園) - Sé
 Jardim de Infância "D. José da Costa Nunes" (魯彌士主教幼稚園) - São Lázaro
 Managed by the APIM-Associação Promotora da Instrução dos Macaenses, it opened on January 20, 1999. Portuguese is the language of instruction.

Table of all secondary schools in Macau:

Former schools
 Public
 Liceu de Macau (closed in 1998)
 Escola Comercial Pedro Nolasco (closed in 1998) - Macanese people established it in 1878, and it was a middle school with a mainly Macanese student body.
 Private
 Escola do Santíssimo Rosário - Santo António (Closing in 2017)
 Sheng Kung Hui Taipa Primary School
 It was an Anglican school operated by the Sheng Kung Hui, and opened in September 2002. In 2004 it served 500 students in levels K1 through P3. Most of the students were Macau permanent residents with some coming from Russia, South America, the United Kingdom, and other countries. The ratio of instruction in English and Standard Chinese respectively was 70 to 30.
 Jose F Pereira Chan designed the campus, located in a downhill direction from what was the International Library of UMAC.

See also
Education in Macau
List of universities in Macau

References

External links

 Macau
 
Schools
Schools
Macau